Stevie TV is an American comedy television series that starred Stevie Ryan and aired on VH1. The series, which aired from March 4, 2012, through July 12, 2013, parodied films, television shows, and actors. VH1 canceled Stevie TV in February 2014.

History
Stevie Ryan moved to L.A. at age 19 to pursue a career in acting and modeling, but she wanted to make people laugh. It was YouTube that inspired Ryan to be funny. She received a camcorder from her ex-boyfriend originally to shoot silent films. Instead, she focused on impersonating celebrities including Justin Bieber, Lady Gaga, Rachel Zoe, and Amy Winehouse. She even developed her own characters on YouTube, such as Mexican-American homegirl Little Loca and 15-year-old wild child Katrina, who claimed she slept with hundreds of men in one day to be on Bang Bus. The characters Ryan played got thousands of YouTube hits that gained the attention of VH1, who gave her her own show.

Production
It was announced in April 2012 that Stevie TV was renewed for a second season, which premiered on May 31, 2013.

Episodes

Series overview

Season 1 (2012)

Season 2 (2013)

References

2010s American parody television series
2010s American sketch comedy television series
2012 American television series debuts
2013 American television series endings
English-language television shows
VH1 original programming